is a Prefectural Natural Park in central Kagoshima Prefecture, Japan. Established in 1953, the park spans the municipalities of Aira, Satsuma, and Satsumasendai.

See also
 National Parks of Japan
 Ramsar Sites in Japan

References

Parks and gardens in Kagoshima Prefecture
Protected areas established in 1953
1953 establishments in Japan